Duplainville is a neighborhood located within the city of Pewaukee, Wisconsin. It is around three miles north of Waukesha, and around 15 miles west of Milwaukee. The area is mainly industrial, but is most known among railfans because of the diamond junction between the Canadian Pacific Railway and the Canadian National Railway.

History 

In 1855, the Chicago, Milwaukee, St. Paul and Pacific Railroad (Milwaukee Road) built a railroad line from Brookfield to Watertown, which eventually went to Portage. In 1885, the Wisconsin Central Railroad built a railroad line from Rugby Junction to Chicago. This eventually led to their tracks crossing in Duplainville. In 1890, a tower was built in the northwest quadrant of the diamond. Because of heavy winter snow, help was hired to keep the tracks and switches clear. Although there were signals and gates at the Duplainville Rd crossing, there were numerous accidents and some fatalities. The tower burned down on January 1, 1929. A new brick building was then built, which was torn down in 1987 after an interchange track was installed in the northeastern quadrant of the diamond connecting the two lines.

The line built by the Milwaukee Road eventually fell under the ownership and control of the Soo Line Railroad in 1986. Canadian Pacific assumed full ownership and control of the line in 1990 after purchasing the Soo Line. The line built by Wisconsin Central went through the ownership of various railroads before being handed to Canadian National in 2001.

The interchange switch on the CP side was removed on or around August 1, 2019 due to a dispute over where in Chicago the railroads should interchange and a lack of activity.

Current railroad operations 
The diamond junction in the center of Duplainville attracts many rail enthusiasts and railroad photographers due to around 20–25 trains that run through each line per day. The east–west mainline belongs to the Canadian Pacific Railway's double-tracked Watertown subdivision, which operates under the Soo Line Railroad subsidiary. Duplainville is at milepost 102.2. The north–south mainline belongs to the Canadian National Railway's single-tracked Waukesha Subdivision, which operates under the Wisconsin Central Ltd. subsidiary. Duplainville is at milepost 102.6. The Wisconsin and Southern Railroad also has trackage rights over this line.

References

External links 
 Railroad Picture Archives

Geography of Waukesha County, Wisconsin
Neighborhoods in Wisconsin